Chondrin is a bluish-white gelatin-like substance, being a protein-carbohydrate complex and can be obtained by boiling cartilage in water.
The cartilage is a connective tissue that contains cells embedded in a matrix of chondrin. Chondrin is made up of two proteins chondroalbunoid and chondromucoid.

See also
 Chondroitin

External links
 Charles Darwin - Insectivorous Plants Page 56

Animal products
Edible thickening agents
Proteins